Lauriston is a lightly populated locality in the Canterbury region of New Zealand's South Island. It was named after one of its pioneer settlers with the name of Laurie.

References

External links
 Farms, faith and families : Lauriston and districts 100 years

Ashburton District
Populated places in Canterbury, New Zealand